The fire-eyed goby (Yoga pyrops) is a species of goby endemic to the marine waters around Australia.

References

Gobiidae
Fish described in 1954